Craney Hill State Forest is in Henniker, New Hampshire. It comprises  along the south side of Old Concord Road and is also bordered by gravel pits on two sides and private land.

See also

List of New Hampshire state forests

References

External links
U.S. Geological Survey Map at the U.S. Geological Survey Map Website. Retrieved December 19th, 2022.

New Hampshire state forests
Henniker, New Hampshire